Connor Downie (born 31 May 2002) is a professional Australian rules footballer who most recently played with the Hawthorn Football Club in the Australian Football League (AFL).

AFL career
Downie's introduction to the sport was through the Auskick program.

Downie is a product of Hawthorn's Next Generation Academy, because of his Chinese heritage. He had been on the Hawks radar for some time as a junior. He was one of the youngest named in a stacked Vic Metro U18s side for 2019.

In the 2020 AFL draft  through the club's Next Generation Academy, had the opportunity to match the  bid and thus secured him with pick 35.

Downie debuted for Hawthorn as part of the trio that debuted in the opening round of the 2021 AFL season against Essendon at Marvel Stadium. Downie was designated as the medical sub for the game but he wasn't needed and didn't spend any time on the ground. The match will always be counted as his first AFL appearance. He helped his team defeat the 2021 premiership contenders. 

On September 2nd 2022, the Hawthorn Football Club announced that Downie would not continue with the club in the 2023 season.

Statistics
Updated to the end of the 2022 season.

|-
| 2021 ||  || 41
| 2 || 0 || 0 || 6 || 6 || 12 || 2 || 0 || 0.0 || 0.0 || 3.0 || 3.0 || 6.0 || 1.0 || 0.0 || 0
|-
| 2022 ||  || 41
| 0 || — || — || — || — || — || — || — || — || — || — || — || — || — || — || 0
|- class="sortbottom"
! colspan=3| Career
! 2 !! 0 !! 0 !! 6 !! 6 !! 12 !! 2 !! 0 !! 0.0 !! 0.0 !! 3.0 !! 3.0 !! 6.0 !! 1.0 !! 0.0 !! 0
|}

References

External links

Living people
2002 births
Hawthorn Football Club players
Box Hill Football Club players
Australian rules footballers from Victoria (Australia)
Eastern Ranges players
Australian people of Chinese descent